Estadio Banco del Pacífico Capwell is a multi-purpose stadium in Guayaquil, Ecuador. It is currently used mostly for football matches and is the home stadium of Emelec. It was announced right after Emelec won the 2013 Ecuador Serie A title that Estadio George Capwell would be completely remodeled to hold a capacity of 40,000 fans. The remodeling work began in June 2014 and ended in December 2016.

In their first league season (Primera Etapa 2017) season at the expanded stadium, Emelec drew an average home attendance of 22,407. It became the highest average in the league, followed by Barcelona SC with 10,572.

Overview
Founder George Lewis Capwell was born in the United States; he traveled to Ecuador to supervise his electric company Empresa Eléctrica del Ecuador, translated into English as the Ecuadorian Electric Company. While supervising the company, Capwell saw that his workers were interested in soccer, therefore, he decided to create a soccer team that bears the company's name, C.S. Emelec.

Capwell's colleagues funded the soccer club on April 28, 1929. Emelec was registered to the Serie C, or C league, in Ecuador in 1929. In 1940 a stadium was built to honor him.

The stadium and its beginnings
Estadio George Capwell is located north of General Gomez Street, south of San Martin, west of Quito Avenue, and east of Montufar Street. It was named after George Capwell not just to honor the soccer club's founder and first president, but also because he led the construction of the stadium. Capwell's initial idea was for the site not to be a soccer field, but a baseball diamond. When soccer's popularity grew in the company and in Guayaquil, the baseball field was quickly converted into a soccer stadium, which it remains to this day.

Construction
Construction of the stadium started in September 1940, when the council of Guayaquil approved the leasing of 4 square blocks for the construction of Emelec's new stadium. On September 8, 1942, the municipality donated the blocks instead of having them leased. On October 15, 1942, the Ecuadorian Republic approved the city blocks for the stadium's construction.
 
On June 24, 1943, the first stone was placed. The construction was completed, and Estadio George Capwell was inaugurated with a baseball game between Emelec and Oriente, on October 21, 1945, with 11,000 fans in attendance. The doors opened to soccer on December 2, 1945; a match was held between Emelec and Manta-Bahia, which Emelec won 5-4.

The Ecuadorian local tournament was won by Emelec because they had won their local title for the first time. A year later, on November 30, 1947, the stadium welcomed international soccer when Guayaquil hosted the Copa America tournament; Estadio Capwell was the stadium host. Once El Estadio Modelo opened its doors in 1959, Estadio Capwell lost its prestige and began to slowly fall into disrepair.

References

External links
 StadiumDB page

External links
Emelec profile 

Sport in Guayaquil
George Capwell
George Capwell
Buildings and structures in Guayaquil
Football venues in Ecuador